Uptown is one of Chicago, Illinois’ 77 community areas. Uptown's boundaries are Foster Avenue on the north; Lake Michigan on the east; Montrose (Ravenswood to Clark), and Irving Park (Clark Street to Lake Michigan) on the south; Ravenswood (Foster to Montrose), and Clark (Montrose to Irving Park) on the west. To the north is Edgewater, to the west is Lincoln Square, and to the south is Lake View.

History

Early years 
The historical, cultural, and commercial center of Uptown is Broadway, with Uptown Square at the center. In 1900, the Northwestern Elevated Railroad constructed its terminal at Wilson and Broadway (now part of the CTA Red Line). Uptown became a summer resort town for downtown dwellers, and derived its name from the Uptown Store, which was the commercial center for the community. For a time, all northbound elevated trains from downtown ended in Uptown.  Uptown became known as an entertainment destination. Charlie Chaplin, Gloria Swanson and other early film stars produced films at the Essanay Studios on Argyle Street. The Aragon Ballroom, Riviera Theater, Uptown Theatre, and Green Mill Jazz Club are all located within a half block of Lawrence and Broadway. Uptown is also home to one of Chicago's most celebrated final resting spots, Graceland Cemetery.

The Uptown neighborhood boundary once extended farther to the North, to Hollywood Avenue. Beginning at the turn of the 20th century, just after the World's Columbian Exposition, the entire area had experienced a housing construction boom. In the mid-1920s, construction of large and luxurious entertainment venues resulted in many of the ornate and historic Uptown Square buildings which exist today. The craftsmanship and artistry of those Uptown Square buildings reflects the ornate pavilions of the Exposition.

For over a century, Uptown has been a popular Chicago entertainment district, which played a significant role in ushering in the Gilded Age, the American Lyceum movement, the jazz age, the silent film era, the swing era, the big band era, the rock and roll era, has been a filming location for over 480 movies, has ties to significant spectator sport athletes and organizations, including the Chicago Blackhawks and three Olympic figure skaters, as well as theater, comedy clubs, dance performers who later became nationally famous, and even "The People's Music School," a needs-based, tuition-free music school for formal classical music training.

Postwar era 
By the 1950s, the middle class was leaving Uptown for more distant suburbs, as commuter rail and elevated train lines were extended. Uptown's housing stock was aging, and old mansions were subdivided. Residential hotels which had housed wives of sailors attached to the Great Lakes Naval Station during World War II now served low-income migrants from the South and Appalachia. Uptown developed a reputation as "Hillbilly Heaven" in the 1950s and the 1960s. The Council of the Southern Mountains, headquartered in Berea, Kentucky, launched the Chicago Southern Center in 1963 in Uptown, with help from the Chicago philanthropist W. Clement Stone. Chicago's anti-poverty program opened the Montrose Urban Progress Center. Students for a Democratic Society initiated a community organizing project, JOIN (Jobs or Income Now) in 1963. Large-scale urban renewal projects like Harry S. Truman College eliminated much low-cost housing, and the low-income Southern white residents dispersed. New waves of Asian, Hispanic, and African-American migrants moved into the remaining neighborhoods.

Latinos forced out from other near downtown and lakefront areas by urban renewal settled close to the border with Lakeview at Sheridan, near Irving Park. In 1975 Young Lords founder Jose (Cha-Cha) Jimenez joined with a broad coalition of whites, blacks and Latinos and ran unsuccessfully against Daley-sponsored Christopher Cohen but still garnered 39% of the vote. His main campaign issue was housing corruption, which was displacing Latinos and the poor from prime real estate areas of Chicago.

21st century 
Most recently, since 2000, gentrification has spread north from neighboring Lakeview and south from Edgewater. Median condo prices jumped 69.1% from 2000-2005.

In 2008, a group of residents sued the City of Chicago over its designation of the Wilson Yards lot as a Tax Increment Financing ("TIF") district.

In December 2009, a Chicago Tribune story reported on the problem facing eastern sections of Uptown where several nursing homes clustered in the area house the mentally ill, including felons. Many of these residents have committed a variety of serious crimes including murder, and 11 nursing homes in the area house 318 convicted felons and 1350 mentally ill people.

Historical records 
Historical images of Uptown can be found in Explore Chicago Collections, a digital repository made available by Chicago Collections archives, libraries and other cultural institutions in the city.

Neighborhoods

Buena Park 
Buena Park is a neighborhood bounded by Montrose Avenue, Irving Park Road, Graceland Cemetery and Lake Shore Drive. At the core of the neighborhood is the Hutchinson Street Historic District, a tree-lined stretch several blocks long featuring mansions that make up "one of the best collections of Prairie-style architecture in the city." It is in sharp contrast to the skyscrapers that populate the area around it. The neighborhood was listed on the National Register of Historic Places in 1984. It can be accessed from the Sheridan stop on the CTA's Red Line.

Robert A. Waller developed Buena Park starting in 1887 by subdividing his property. The site of the original Waller home now holds St. Mary of the Lake church (built in 1917). Buena Park pre-dates the remainder of Uptown by a number of years. Buena Park is also home to one of the most active neighborhood organizations in Chicago: Buena Park Neighbors.

"The Delectable Ballad of the Waller Lot" by Chicago poet Eugene Field:

Up yonder in Buena Park
There is a famous spot,
In legend and in history
(Known as) the Waller lot.

Sheridan Park

Sheridan Park is a neighborhood roughly bounded by Lawrence Avenue on the north, Clark Street on the west, Montrose on the south, and Broadway on the east. It is mostly residential, containing six-flats, single family homes, and courtyard apartment buildings. There is a growing business district along Wilson Avenue, which bisects Sheridan Park. Truman College, one of the City Colleges of Chicago, is also located in Sheridan Park. The neighborhood can be accessed from either the Wilson or Lawrence stop on the CTA's Red Line.

In 1985, the Sheridan Park Historic District (a National Landmark District) was established to protect the unique single-family and smaller multi-family architecture of the area. According to the National Park Service, the district is roughly bounded by Lawrence Avenue on the north, Clark Street on the west, Montrose on the south, and Racine on the east. Some structures of Uptown Square were also added as contributing structures. 

In December 2007, the Chicago City Council approved the Dover Street Historic District in Sheridan Park. This designation covered the three northern blocks of Dover Street and four single-family homes on the west side of adjacent Beacon Street just south of Lawrence Avenue. Unlike federal Landmark District status, City landmark status limits the demolition and modification of properties without the approval of the Chicago Landmarks Commission.

Argyle Street

More recently known as "Asia on Argyle," but also known as "Little Saigon", and "Little Vietnam", this neighborhood was mostly populated by residents of Vietnamese and Cambodian nationality. However, many, if not most, were from ethnic Chinese minorities, and for that reason became refugees during the Sino-Vietnamese War of the late 1970s. Many ethnic residents continue to migrate to other neighborhoods and to the suburbs while keeping their businesses in the span of just a few city blocks. Argyle Square hosts Asian grocery stores as well as ethnic Vietnamese, Thai, Laotian, and Chinese restaurants.

The neighborhood should not be confused with Chinatown, which is in the Armour Square community area on the South Side of the city.

The neighborhood is served by the Argyle stop on the CTA's Red Line and CTA busses on Sheridan Rd. and Broadway.

Margate Park 

Margate Park is situated in the extreme northeast corner of the Uptown community, nestled between the recently rejuvenated strip of new construction on Sheridan Road and the pleasantries of the northern reaches of Lincoln Park. It is bound by Lincoln Park and Sheridan Road to its east and west, and Foster Avenue and Lawrences Avenue to its north and south, respectively.

Its tree-lined streets, historic mansions, and gilded mid-rises reflect the area's development in the bustle of Uptown's entertainment industry from the early 1900s, now undergoing a burgeoning revitalization. The diverse housing also includes ornate, imposing terra-cotta clad buildings, immortalized in the movies of early twentieth century Chicago as apartment hotels and boarding houses. Some of these 1920s, Jazz-Age hotels have since been converted to high-end condos and co-ops, adding to the tremendously diverse population of the area.  The Margate Park community, as well as much of the Uptown neighborhood of which it is a part, is a popular and thriving home to many of the city's LGBT residents.  On Margate Park's western edge is also one of the city's longest running gay bars, Big Chicks, owned and operated for the past 30 years.  Designed in 1937 by architect Charles Kristen, its asymmetrical facade, clearly influenced by the 1933-34 Century of Progress Exposition in Chicago, features dazzling decoration, with yellow vertical piers on a backdrop of cobalt blue, as well as splashes of aqua. The building itself is architecturally significant for its deco facade.

Margate Park contains a Lake Shore Drive underpass near Argyle Avenue adjacent to the Margate Playground, just east of Marine Drive, which permits pedestrians and bikers easy access to the lakefront path and the Foster and Lawrence Avenue beaches.

Many of the houses here were built from the 1890s to the 1920s. Although it has remained a mostly white and wealthy area throughout the 20th century, it is a fairly integrated community. In 1940 some blacks who lived as domestic workers resided in a single block of houses in close proximity to their employers. Those houses were described by Jacalyn D. Harden, author of Double Cross: Japanese Americans in Black and White Chicago, as being "modest".

At 5000 North Marine Drive is The Aquitania, a co-op building constructed in 1923 and listed on the National Register of Historic Places since 2002.  The Aquitania was built by Ralph C. Harris and Byron H. Jillson in the Classical Revival style. It was developed by George K. Spoor, the co-founder of Essanay Studios, a producer of silent movies in the first decades of the twentieth century. At this time, Chicago rivaled both New York City and Hollywood in film production, and Spoor was able to use his considerable wealth to build an apartment he felt fitting for the film stars connected with Chicago's growing entertainment industry.

Landmarks

Uptown Entertainment District 
Historically a very popular tourist destination, the Uptown Entertainment District is home to various music venues, nightclubs, restaurants and shops. The Uptown Entertainment District is now experiencing a revival, with new restaurants and shops opening every year. Uptown Square, at the center of the Uptown Entertainment District, was designated as a National Historic District on the National Register of Historic Places in 2000. Uptown is also a stop for Chicago Gangster tours, with many locations tied to infamous gangsters such as John Dillinger, Al Capone, Machine Gun Jack McGurn, Roger Touhy  ("Terrible Touhy")  and others.

Aragon Ballroom

The Aragon Ballroom is still a very popular music venue. During the 1920s and 1930s, most of the nation's well-known jazz groups played the Aragon. Live radio broadcasts from the Aragon helped promote the Aragon's entertainers throughout the Midwest and beyond. Hotels quickly sprang up in the Uptown area, and it became a mecca for young adults who visited Chicago to dance to the Big Bands of the 1940s and 1950s. Frank Sinatra, Tommy Dorsey, Glenn Miller, Benny Goodman, Duke Ellington, Lawrence Welk, Guy Lombardo, Wayne King and other famous bandleaders often played there. In decades to follow, a very diverse selection of "big name" groups have performed, including The Rolling Stones, U2, The Smiths, The Doors, Snoop Dogg, Green Day, Gwen Stefani, The B-52s, Capital Cities, The Talking Heads/David Burn,  B.B. King, Robert Plant, Metallica, Tommy Bolin, Morrisey, Queens of the Stone Age, The Clash, Tangerine Dream, deadmau5, Tiësto, Nirvana, The Ramones and many others.

The Aragon Ballroom is located at the intersection of Lawrence and Winthrop Avenues, just adjacent to the Lawrence Red Line 'L' stop.

Riviera Theater
The Riviera Theater, also a popular music venue, was once a Jazz Age movie palace which featured live jazz performances with the movies. In the 1980s, the seats were removed on the main floor and it was converted to a concert venue.

Uptown Theatre

The Uptown Theatre is a large, ornate movie palace with almost 4,500 seats. The largest in Chicago, this architectural gem is on several Landmark Registers. The Uptown Theatre was designed by famous movie palace architects, Rapp and Rapp, who also designed the Chicago Theatre in the Chicago Loop. It was managed by the Balaban and Katz Company.

The Uptown Theatre as of 2018 will  begin renovation, after numerous attempts, by Friends of the Uptown Theatre and other local groups to restore and reopen the theater with $75 million renaissance plan. Progress was stymied for years by various legal issues, including disputes by multiple mortgage holders and city liens. However, on August 18, 2008, the Uptown Theatre was sold to Jam Productions Ltd, a Chicago-based music promoter who has committed to bringing a spectacular entertainment venue comparable to the Chicago Theatre in the Loop's Theatre District downtown. In November 2019, the Chicago Tribune reported that the start of the renovation was still stalled due to slow private fundraising needed for the project. Development plans, within blocks, call for renovation of the former AON Insurance building to luxury mixed use retail and apartments already in progress, new high-rise apartment/retail building at Broadway and Winona Street, new parking structure on Lawrence at the Redline, and plans for a new high-rise luxury hotel.

A 2006 documentary, Uptown: Portrait of a Palace, shows the interior of the theatre. It is also featured on the cover of the book The Chicago Movie Palaces of Balaban and Katz by David Balaban.

Green Mill Cocktail Lounge

The Green Mill Cocktail Lounge is located at 4802 N. Broadway in Chicago, on the site of a much bigger Green Mill Gardens complex, which was an outdoor music gardens fashioned after The Moulin Rouge Gardens in Paris. It was a sunken gardens area, surrounded by a wall and featured nightly entertainment during the summer months. It also featured a dining room which was later converted to the Green Mill Cocktail Lounge during construction of the Uptown Theatre on the former site of the outdoor music gardens. The club was once owned by "Machine Gun" Jack McGurn, a right-hand man of Al Capone, who was a regular patron at The Green Mill. The 1957 movie The Joker Is Wild is based on the life of a regular performer at the Green Mill, Joe E. Lewis. Starring Frank Sinatra, the movie is the story about how Lewis tried to leave his gig at the Green Mill and was attacked and left for dead in his apartment. Lewis survived and continued his successful career in California. The Green Mill still hosts top jazz performers. Patricia Barber, internationally acclaimed jazz performer, plays there most Monday nights, as she has for the past 15 + years. In 2008, Kurt Elling was a regularly featured performer with his current band. The Green Mill also hosts a weekly Poetry Slam. Poet Marc Smith is credited for developing the Poetry Slam, and still hosts the weekly events at the Green Mill.

Baton Show Lounge and Double Door
In late 2018, it was announced that two established Chicago entertainment venues were moving to Uptown.  The Baton Show Lounge which opened in 1969, has hosted many celebrities, and presents drag performance.  The popular indie music venue Double Door (established, 1994) plans to reopen the Wilson Avenue Theater.  The Wilson first presented vaudeville in 1910, although its classical architecture caused it to be used as a bank for most of the 20th and into the 21st century.

Former venues

The Rainbo
The Rainbo, at 4812 N. Clark Street, was purchased in 2002 and torn down to make way for a new condo and townhouse development. At one point, however, it was a very popular outdoor music garden, fashioned after the Moulin Rouge Gardens in Paris, which is the original namesake for what was then called "Moulin Rouge Gardens."

Investors bought the Moulin Rouge Gardens property and spent one-million dollars to expand the facility. Opened in 1921, Mann's Million Dollar Rainbo Room, named after Fred Mann's wartime service in the U.S. Army's 42nd Infantry or "Rainbow" Division, was said to be the largest nightclub in America, featuring some of the biggest names in Vaudeville and musical entertainment. Larry Fine was performing there the night he was asked to join The Three Stooges. The Rainbo Room had a revolving stage to allow for continuous entertainment. There was table seating for 2,000 patrons and space on the dance floor for an additional 1,500. Until 1927, WMAQ radio shared the 670 kilohertz frequency with station WQJ, which was owned by the Rainbo and Calumet Baking Powder Company; it broadcast music of the Rainbo's performers as a form of promotion.

In 1927, during prohibition, it was converted to a major casino and sports venue, called the Rainbo Fronton.

In 1934, during the Chicago World's Fair (Century of Progress), it became French Casino. The French Casino is where John Dillinger spent his birthday, June 22, 1934, a month before he was shot.

In 1939, it became Mike Todd's Theater Cafe, which was a popular dinner theater. Tommy Sutton, the Theater Cafe's choreographer, went on to work with Cab Calloway, Duke Ellington and Nat King Cole, among others. It was also a venue for Championship Wrestling where, in 1955, the first women's tag team wrestling match was held.

In 1957, The Theater Cafe was converted to an ice skating rink, called Rainbo Arena, which was a practice rink for the Chicago Blackhawks including the year they won the 1961 Stanley Cup. The Rainbo Arena was also a training rink for several Olympic figure skaters, and during much of the 1960s was the only indoor hockey rink in the Chicago area open to the public. Several hockey leagues were headquartered at Rainbo, and particularly on weekends, hockey-playing groups would rent the ice at all hours of the day and night.

The south end of the building housed a pro bowling alley in the 1960s which was converted in 1968 into the original Electric Theatre/Kinetic Playground music venue.

In the 1970s and thereafter, Rainbo was a popular late night roller rink until it was torn down for a new housing development called Rainbo Village. When the building was being demolished in 2003, an assortment of human bones and tennis shoes were discovered in what had been the building's basement. How the bones and shoes ended up there has remained unresolved.

Arcadia Ballroom
The Arcadia Ballroom, at 4444 N. Broadway was one of the first Dance Halls in Chicago. Promoter Paddy Harmon, who later developed Dreamland Ballroom and the Chicago Stadium, found that black jazz bands were popular with the Arcadia Ballroom late night crowds. It was one of the few places on the north side of Chicago which would book black jazz bands in the 1920s and 1930s, the other being the Green Mill Jazz Club. The building was destroyed in a fire in the 1950s.

5100 Club
The 5100 Club, at 5100 N. Broadway, was a nightclub that hosted comedy performances before the advent of television. One regular headliner was Danny Thomas, who was discovered there by the head of the William Morris Agency. Danny would later go on to star in movies and in "Make Room For Daddy", one of the longest running sitcoms in American Television history.

Argyle Street Asian restaurants and shops 
Argyle Street, from Sheridan to Broadway and spilling onto Broadway, features Chinese, Vietnamese, Thai, Laotian, French Vietnamese and Cambodian ethnic restaurants and bakeries. There are also many Asian groceries, shops and trading companies that sell unique Asian merchandise. This area is locally called by many different names, including New Chinatown, North Chinatown, Little Chinatown, Little Saigon, New Saigon, Little Cambodia, Vietnamese Town, Little Vietnam, or by many in the Asian community simply as "Argyle". The surrounding neighborhood, which has attracted Asian immigrants and refugees for the past several decades, is listed on the National Register of Historic Places as the West Argyle Street Historic District. It is easily reached by the Argyle stop on the Red Line 'L.'

One block east of the Argyle 'L' stop, at the corner of Argyle and Winthrop is The Roots of Argyle mural, a community-produced painting depicting 100 years of immigration and daily life on Argyle Street.

Graceland Cemetery 

In southwestern Uptown is historic Graceland Cemetery.  Visitors here can find the elaborate tombs of Chicago's famed dead.  Because some of Chicago's famous architects designed memorials and are buried here, the Chicago Architecture Foundation offers several walking tours of the cemetery during the spring, summer, and fall.

Amenities

Parks, beaches and boating 

Chicago's Lincoln Park straddles Uptown—providing soccer and athletic fields, a segment of the Chicago lakefront bicycle/running path, Montrose Point Bird Sanctuary ("The Magic Hedge"), a sledding hill, Puptown Dog Park, Wilson Skatepark and Waveland (Marovitz) Golf Course to the south. Also in the Uptown portion of Lincoln Park is Montrose Beach, which includes a dog beach at its northern edge, and Montrose Harbor, a marina for local and transient boaters and home to the Chicago Corinthian Yacht Club.

One park, which is an inland part of lakefront Lincoln Park, is located just west of Lake Shore Drive, called Clarendon Park, and the Margate Field House in North Lincoln Park both feature athletic fields, children's playgrounds and indoor sports facilities. Chase Park, located on the west side of Clark Street at Leland Avenue, has indoor and outdoor athletic facilities, as well as an outdoor pool and tennis courts.

Hospitals 
 Chicago Lakeshore Hospital
 Methodist Hospital of Chicago
 Thorek Memorial Hospital
 Louis A. Weiss Memorial Hospital

Schools 

Chicago Public Schools operates district public schools:

K-8 schools serving sections of Uptown:
 Brennemann Elementary School
 Goudy Elementary School
 McCutcheon Elementary School
 McPherson Elementary School
 Ravenswood Elementary School
 Stockton Elementary School
 Courtenay Language Arts Center

Most residents are zoned to Senn High School while those west of Ashland are zoned to Amundsen High School.

CPS magnet schools:
 Walt Disney Magnet School

High schools:
 Uplift Community High School

Private schools:
 Our Lady of Lourdes Elementary School (closed 2004)
 St. Mary of the Lake Elementary School
 St. Thomas of Canterbury Elementary School

The previous campus of the Lycée Français de Chicago was located in Uptown Chicago.

Colleges and universities:
 Harry S Truman College
 St. Augustine College
 American Islamic College

Cultural
The Haitian American Museum of Chicago
The American Indian Center was located for decades in Uptown and moved to nearby Albany Park in 2017

Politics and government

United States Congress 
Most of Uptown is located in Illinois's 9th congressional district, and some of the westernmost part of the community area is located in the 5th congressional district.

Chicago City Council 
Uptown is divided into multiple wards, which are the districts from which aldermen in the Chicago City Council are drawn. Most of the community area lies in the 46th and 48th wards, with small portions of the neighborhood's west side located in the 47th and 40th wards.

Transportation
Uptown is served by the Argyle station, Lawrence station, and Wilson station, on the Chicago Transit Authority's Red Line, which provides 24-hour service between Rogers Park and Roseland. Just to the west of the neighborhood is Ravenswood station on Metra's Union Pacific / North Line, which provides commuter rail service between Kenosha station and Ogilvie Transportation Center. The Chicago Transit Authority's #92 Foster, #81 Lawrence, #78 Montrose, #80 Irving Park, #22 Clark, #36 Broadway, #146 Inner Drive Express & #151 Sheridan bus lines serve the neighborhood. For cyclists, the neighborhood is best traversed by Broadway (North/South) and Lawrence Avenue (East/West), both of which have bicycle lanes on all or some of the road. For motorists, Lake Shore Drive has exit ramps at Foster Avenue, Lawrence Avenue, Wilson Avenue, Montrose Avenue, and Irving Park Road.

Notable people

 Eric Gunnar Gibson (1919–1944), soldier in the United States Army and recipient of the Medal of Honor for his actions in World War II. He was a childhood resident of Uptown and lived at 4040 North Broadway.
 Harold Ernest Goettler (1890–1918), aviator in the United States Army Air Service awarded the Medal of Honor for valor during the search for the Lost Battalion. He was raised at 4630 North Dover Street.
 Talen Horton-Tucker (born 2000), NBA player.
 William C. Marland (1918–1965), politician and 24th Governor of West Virginia. After his time as Governor, he lived at a YMCA at 1725 West Wilson Avenue from 1961 to 1965 while working as a taxi cab driver and recovering from alcoholism.
 George R. R. Martin (born 1948), novelist and short story writer best known for A Song of Ice and Fire. He lived in Uptown while performing alternative service work as a VISTA volunteer attached to the Cook County Legal Assistance Foundation.
 Ayanna Pressley (born 1974), member of the United States House of Representatives from Massachusetts's 7th congressional district since 2019. Pressley was a childhood resident of Uptown, moving to attend college at Boston University.
 Iva Toguri D'Aquino (1916–2006), English-language radio broadcaster who transmitted Radio Tokyo's propaganda to Allied soldiers in the South Pacific during World War II on The Zero Hour radio show. Toguri lived in a three-flat in Uptown after the War.

Notes

References

External links

 Official City of Chicago Uptown Community Map
 Lakeside Community Development Corporation
 Business Partners- The Chamber for Uptown
 Uptown Chicago Commission
 Buena Park Neighbors
 Magnolia Malden Neighbors
 Compass Rose Cultural Crossroads Collection of articles, some of which relate to Uptown history
 Uptown History Blog Blog with images from Uptown's past.
 Uptown Update News and Commentary from the 46th Ward of Chicago
 SeeClickFix Report non-emergency issues in the Uptown neighborhood

Appalachian culture in Illinois
Community areas of Chicago
North Side, Chicago
Beaches of Cook County, Illinois